Bhootchakra Pvt. Ltd. is a 2019 Bengali adventure horror film directed by Haranath Chakraborty and produced by Nispal Singh. The film starring Soham Chakraborty, Bonny Sengupta, Gaurav Chakrabarty, Srabanti Chatterjee, Rittika Sen, Kaushik Sen, Paran Bandopadhyay and Shantilal Mukherjee, is an adventure film and follows three boys and their search for ghosts. The film is a remake of 2017 Telugu movie Anando Brahma was released on 5 July 2019, under the banner of Surinder Films.

Plot
The plot revolves around three youngsters and their search for ghosts. They get a unique machine called Bhootjantra, declared them as ghost hunters who can eradicate evil spirits. They start the enterprise named Bhootchakra Private Limited and decide to make some profit on it. But unexpectedly their lies turn out to be true, the friends trio fall into a serious trouble.

Cast

Release 
The film was released on 5 July 2019.

Soundtrack

References

Bengali-language Indian films
2010s Bengali-language films
2019 horror films
2019 films
Indian adventure films
Indian horror films
Films scored by Anupam Roy
2010s adventure films
Bengali remakes of Telugu films
Films directed by Haranath Chakraborty